West Virginia Route 66 is an east–west state highway located within Pocahontas County, West Virginia. The route runs  from U.S. Route 219 and West Virginia Route 55 near Snowshoe east to West Virginia Route 28 and West Virginia Route 92 south of Green Bank. WV 66 is maintained by the West Virginia Division of Highways.

Route description
WV 66 begins at a 3-way intersection with the concurrent US 219 and WV 55 at the base of Cheat Mountain near Snowshoe, in the unincorporated community of Linwood. The route initially heads southeast along the northern bank of the Big Spring Fork. WV 66 then meets Pocahontas County Route 9/3, a loop route which serves as the primary access road to the Snowshoe Mountain ski resort.

After passing south of Snowshoe, WV 66 turns eastward toward the community of Cass. The route intersects Pocahontas County Route 1 and passes north of the community of Deer Creek before entering Cass. WV 66 intersects County Route 1 again and crosses the Greenbrier River in Cass before turning northeast and following the north bank of Deer Creek. After a junction with Pocahontas County Route 7/1, WV 66 crosses Deer Creek and heads eastward. The road terminates at the concurrent WV 28 and WV 92 south of Green Bank.

Major intersections

References

066
Transportation in Pocahontas County, West Virginia